MV Georgette was a ferry owned by Transperth on the Swan River in Perth, Western Australia.

History
Georgette was built in 1981 by Alf Jahansen in Forster as Bardoo for use on Wallis Lake. However its draft was too great to cross sandbars at low tide, so in December 1981 it was sold for use on Port Hacking in Sydney. It was sold again in October 1982 to the Metropolitan Transport Trust and moved by road to be by refurbished by Precision Marine, North Fremantle.

It was named Georgette after Georgette Adams, the long-time secretary of the Metropolitan Transport Trust's managing director.

References

Ferries of Western Australia
Ships built in New South Wales
1981 ships